Gerd Kennel (born 3 May 1952) is a German weightlifter. He competed in the men's light heavyweight event at the 1976 Summer Olympics.

References

External links
 

1952 births
Living people
German male weightlifters
Olympic weightlifters of West Germany
Weightlifters at the 1976 Summer Olympics
People from Völklingen
Sportspeople from Saarland